The Christopher Award (established 1949) is presented to the producers, directors, and writers of books, films and television specials that "affirm the highest values of the human spirit". It is given by The Christophers, a Christian organization founded in 1945 by the Maryknoll priest James Keller.

Judging process
Publishers, TV networks, and film directors are asked to submit titles and work that they believe to be award-worthy. Industry professionals and Christopher staff members make the final selections based on:

 Artistic and technical proficiency
 Significant degree of public acceptance
 Affirmation of the highest values of the human spirit

Categories
Christopher Leadership Awards
Christopher Life Achievement Award
Christopher Spirit Award
James Keller Award
Books for Adults
Books for Young People
Feature Films
Television & Cable

Selection of previous winners/honorees

Christopher Leadership Awards 
2002 Rudy Giuliani
2004 Father John T. Catoir
2005 Sargent Shriver
2008 Cardinal John Patrick Foley
2011 Scotty Smiley

Christopher Life Achievement Award 
2003 Mary Higgins Clark
2004 Art Linkletter
2005 Robert Coles
2006 Dave Brubeck
2008 David McCullough
2012 Mother Dolores Hart
2016 Ernie Anastos
2018 Ken Burns

Christopher Spirit Award 
2016 When Calls the Heart

James Keller Award 
2004 Caroll Spinney
2005 Pat LaFontaine
2011 Shannon Hickey
2012 Marty Lyons

Books for Adults 

1987
 Kaffir Boy: The True Story of a Black Youth's Coming of Age in Apartheid South Africa

2001 
 Aging with Grace, by David Snowdon, PhD (Bantam Books)
 Choosing Mercy, by Antoinette Bosco (Orbis Books)
 Freedom's Daughters, by Lynne Olson (Scribner)
 An Hour Before Daylight, by Jimmy Carter (Simon & Schuster)
 John Adams, by David McCullough (Simon & Schuster)
 Nickel and Dimed, by Barbara Ehrenreich (Metropolitan Books/Henry Holt and Company, LLC)

2002
 Aging with Grace by David Snowdon, PhD
 Choosing Mercy by Antoinette Bosco
 Freedom's Daughters by Lynne Olson
 An Hour Before Daylight by Jimmy Carter
 John Adams by David McCullough
 Nickel and Dimed by Barbara Ehrenreich

2003
 Choosing Naia: A Family’s Journey by Mitchell Zuckoff
 The Day the World Came to Town: 9/11 in Gander, Newfoundland by Jim DeFede
  Fatal Passage: The Story of John Rae, The Arctic Hero Time Forgot by Ken McGoogan
 Five Past Midnight in Bhopal by Dominique Lapierre & Javier Moro 
 Jim's Last Summer: Lessons on Living from a Dying Priest by Teresa Rhodes McGee
 Standing on Holy Ground: A Triumph Over Hate Crime in the Deep South by Sandra E. Johnson

2004
 A Human Being Died That Night by Pumla Gobodo-Madikizela
 If I Get to Five by Fred Epstein, M.D., & Joshua Horwitz 
 The Life You Save May Be Your Own: An American Pilgrimage by Paul Elie
 My Heart Will Cross This Ocean: My Story, My Son, Amadou by Kadiatou Diallo & Craig Wolff
 My Path Leads to Tibet by Sabriye Tenberken
 Sisters: Catholic Nuns and the Making of America by John J. Fialka
 Triangle: The Fire That Changed America by David Von Drehle

2005
 Anatomy of Hope by Jerome Groopman, M.D. 
 Blood Done Sign My Name by Timothy Tyson 
 The Freedom Line by Peter Eisner
 I Am a Pencil: A Teacher, His Kids, and Their World of Stories by Sam Swope
 Love in the Driest Season: A Family Memoir by Neely Tucker
 Mao's Last Dancer: A Memoir by Li Cunxin

2006
 The Death of Innocents: An Eyewitness Account of Wrongful Executions by Sister Helen Prejean 
 The Glass Castle by Jeannette Walls 
 One Soldier's Story: A Memoir by Bob Dole
 The Prison Angel: Mother Antonia’s Journey from Beverly Hills to a Life of Service in a Mexican Jail by Mary Jordan & Kevin Sullivan 
 They Poured Fire on Us From the Sky by Benson Deng, Alephonsion Deng & Benjamin Ajak, with Judy A. Bernstein

2007
 Barefootin': Life Lessons from the Road to Freedom by Unita Blackwell with JoAnne Prichard Morris
 Enrique's Journey by Sonia Nazario
 The Language of God: A Scientist Presents Evidence for Belief by Francis Collins
 Left to Tell: Discovering God Amidst the Rwandan Holocaust by Immaculée Ilibagiza with Steve Erwin
 The Lemon Tree: An Arab, a Jew, and the Heart of the Middle East by Sandy Tolan 
 My Life with the Saints by James Martin

2008 
 Brother, I'm Dying by Edwidge Danticat
  The Florist's Daughter by Patricia Hempl
  The Invisible Wall: A Love Story That Broke Barriers by Harry Bernstein
  The Lonely Patient: How We Experience Illness by Michael Stein, M.D.
  A Long Way Gone: Memoirs of a Boy Soldier by Ishmael Beah
  A Slave No More: Two Men Who Escaped to Freedom by David W. Blight

2009 
 Alex & Me by Irene Pepperberg
 American-Made—The Enduring Legacy of the WPA: When FDR Put the Nation to Work by Nick Taylor 
 Final Salute: A Story of Unfinished Lives by Jim Sheeler
 Founding Faith: Providence, Politics, and the Birth of Religious Freedom in America by Steven Waldman
 The Soloist: A Lost Dream, an Unlikely Friendship, and the Redemptive Power of Music by Steve Lopez
 Until Our Last Breath: A Holocaust Story of Love and Partisan Resistance by Michael Bart and Laurel Corona

2010
 A. Lincoln: A Biography by Ronald C. White, Jr.
 Stones into Schools by Greg Mortenson 
 Strength in What Remains by Tracy Kidder
 Wrestling with Moses: How Jane Jacobs Took on New York's Master Builder and Transformed the American City by Anthony Flint

2011
 Bonhoeffer: Pastor, Martyr, Prophet, Spy by Eric Metaxas
 The Jesuit Guide to (Almost) Everything by James Martin
 Thea's Song: The Life of Thea Bowman by Charlene Smith and John Feister
 Unbroken: A World War II Story of Survival, Resilience, and Redemption by Laura Hillenbrand
 Washington: A Life by Ron Chernow

2012
 A Good and Perfect Gift by Julia Becker
 An Invisible Thread by Laura Schroff and Alex Tresniowski
 I Shall Not Hate by Izzeldin Abuelaish
 Kisses from Katie by Katie Davis and Beth Clark
 Little Princes by Conor Grennan

2013
 Carly’s Voice by Arthur Fleischmann and Carly Fleischmann
 Fearless by Eric Blehm
 A Good Man by Mark Shriver
 My Sisters the Saints by Colleen Carroll Campbell 
 Road to Valor by Aili and Andres McConnon

2014
 American Story: A Lifetime Search for Ordinary People Doing Extraordinary Things by Bob Dotson (Viking Press/Penguin Group)
 Love and Salt: A Spiritual Friendship Shared in Letters by Amy Andrews and Jessica Mesman Griffith (Loyola Press)
 The Miracle of Father Kapaun: Priest, Soldier, and Korean War Hero by Roy Wenzl and Travis Heying (Ignatius Press)
 On These Courts: A Miracle Season That Changed a City, a Once-Future Star, and a Team Forever by Wayne B. Drash (Touchstone Books/Simon and Schuster)
 Walk In Their Shoes: Can One Person Change the World? by Jim Ziolkowski with James S. Hirsch (Simon and Schuster)

2015
 The Invisible Front: Love and Loss in an Era of Endless War by Yochi Dreazen (Crown Publishers).

2016
 Five Years in Heaven: The Unlikely Friendship That Answered Life’s Greatest Questions by John Schlimm (Image Books/Crown Publishing)
 The Gift of Caring: Saving Our Parents from the Perils of Modern Healthcare by Marcy Cottrell Houle and Elizabeth Eckstrom (Taylor Trade Publishing/Rowman & Littlefield)
 One Righteous Man: Samuel Battle and the Shattering of the Color Line in New York by Arthur Browne (Beacon Press)
 Tough As They Come by Travis Mills with Marcus Brotherton (Convergent Books/Crown Publishing)
 Under the Same Sky: From Starvation in North Korea to Salvation in America by Joseph Kim with Stephan Talty (Houghton Mifflin Harcourt)
 The Wind in the Reeds: A Storm, a Play, and the City That Would Not Be Broken by Wendell Pierce (Riverhead Books/Random House)

Books for Young People 

2001
 Ages 6–8: How Do Dinosaurs Say Good Night? by Jane Yolen, illustrated by Mark Teague (The Blue Sky Press/Scholastic Inc.)
 Ages 9–10: The Mousery by Charlotte Pomerantz, illustrated by Kurt Cyrus (Gulliver Books/Harcourt, Inc.)
 Ages 11–12: The Yellow Star by Carmen Agra Deedy, illustrated by Henri Sørensen (Peachtree Publishers, Ltd.)
 Ages 11–12: Hope Was Here by Joan Bauer (G. P. Putnam's Sons)
 Young Adult: The Wanderer by Sharon Creech (Joanna Cotler Books/HarperCollins Publishers)

2002
 Kiss Good Night by Amy Hest with illustrations by Anita Jeram 
 Ages 6–8: Beatrice's Goat  by Page McBrier with illustrations by Lori Lohstoeter
 Ages 8–10: Love That Dog by Sharon Creech
 Ages 10–12: Uncle Daddy by Ralph Fletcher
 Young Adult: Soldier X by Don L. Wulffson and Witness by Karen Hesse

2003
 People Mole and the Baby Bird by Marjorie Newman with illustrations by Patrick Benson 
 Ages 6–8: Dear Mrs. Larue: Letters from Obedience School  written and illustrated by Mark Teague
 Ages 8–10: The Ugly Princess and the Wise Fool by Margaret Gray with illustrations by Randy Cecil
 Ages 10–12: Pictures of Hollis Woods by Patricia Reilly Giff
 Young Adult: Left for Dead by Pete Nelson

2004
 Preschool: Little Bear’s Little Boat by Eve Bunting with illustrations by Nancy Carpenter
 Ages 6–8: The Dot  written and illustrated by Peter H. Reynolds
 Ages 8–10: Harvesting Hope: The Story of Cesar Chavez by Kathleen Krull with illustrations by Yuyi Morales
 Ages 10–12: Iqbal by Francesco D’Adamo
 Young Adult: The Silent Boy by Lois Lowry

2005
 Preschool: Never, Ever Shout in a Zoo by Karma Wilson with illustrations by Doug Cushman
 Ages 6–8: The Hungry Coat: A Tale from Turkey written and illustrated by Demi
 Ages 8–10: Shredderman: Secret Identity by Wendelin Van Draanen with illustrations by Brian Biggs
 Ages 10–12: The Teacher's Funeral: A Comedy in Three Parts by Richard Peck
 Young Adult: Thura’s Diary: My Life in Wartime Iraq by Thura Al Windawi

2006
 Preschool: Am I a Color Too? by Heidi Cole & Nancy Vogl with illustrations by Gerald Purnell (Preschool)
 Ages 6–8: I Could Do That! Esther Morris Gets Women the Vote by Linda Arms White with illustrations by Nancy Carpenter
 Ages 8–10: Game Day by Tiki Barber and Ronde Barber with Robert Burleigh, illustrations by Barry Root
 Ages 10–12: Friendship According to Humphrey by Betty G. Birney
 Young Adult: Hitch by Jeanette Ingold

2007
 Preschool: Hero Cat by Eileen Spinelli with illustrations by Jo Ellen McAllister Stammen
 Ages 6–8: How We Are Smart by W. Nikola-Lisa with illustrations by Sean Qualls
 Ages 8–10: The Miraculous Journey of Edward Tulane by Kate DiCamillo with illustrations by Bagram Ibatoulline
 Ages 10–12: Listen! by Stephanie S. Tolan
 Young Adult: Bread and Roses, Too by Katherine Paterson

2008
 Preschool: Taking a Bath with the Dog and Other Things That Make Me Happy by Scott Menchin
 Ages 6–8: How Many Seeds in a Pumpkin? by Margaret McNamara with illustrations by G. Brian Karas
 Ages 8–10: Owen & Mzee: The Language of Friendship by Isabella Hatkoff, Craig Hatkoff, and Dr. Paula Kahumbu with photographs by Peter Greste
 Ages 10–12: The Wild Girls by Pat Murphy
 Young Adult: Diamonds in the Shadow by Caroline B. Cooney

2009
 Preschool: Close to You: How Animals Bond by Kimiko Kajikawa
 Ages 6–8: That Book Woman by Heather Henson with illustrations by David Small
 Ages 8–10: Clementine's Letter by Sara Pennypacker with illustrations by Marla Frazee
 Ages 10–12: Shooting the Moon by Frances O’Roark Dowell
 Young Adult: Sunrise Over Fallujah by Walter Dean Myers

2010
 Preschool: Ten Days and Nine Nights: An Adoption Story by Yumi Heo
 Ages 6–8: Nubs: The True Story of a Mutt, a Marine & a Miracle by Major Brian Dennis, Kirby Larson, & Mary Nethery
 Ages 8–10: Most Loved in All the World by Tonya Cherie Hegamin with illustrations by Cozbi A. Cabrera
 Ages 10–12: Extra Credit by Andrew Clements with illustrations by Mark Elliott
 Young Adult: A Pearl in the Storm: How I Found My Heart in the Middle of the Ocean by Tori Murden

2011
 Knuffle Bunny Free: An Unexpected Diversion by Mo Willems
 Would You Still Love Me If... by Wendy LaGuardia with illustrations by Patricia Keeler 
 Brother Jerome and the Angels in the Bakery by Father Dominic Garramone 
 Lafayette and the American Revolution by Russell Freedman

2012
 Shine: Choices to Make God Smile by Genny Monchamp with illustrations by Karol Kaminski
 Waiting for the Biblioburro by Monica Brown with illustrations by John Parra
 You Can Be a Friend by Tony Dungy and Lauren Dungy with illustrations by Ron Mazellan
 Hooper Finds a Family by Jane Paley
 Words in the Dust by Trent Reedy
 Close to Famous by Joan Bauer

2013
 Forever You: A Book About Your Soul and Body by Nicole Lataif with illustrations by Mary Rojas 
 The Fantastic Flying Books of Mr. Morris Lessmore by William Joyce with illustrations by Joe Bluhm
 The House on Dirty-Third Street by Jo S. Kittinger with illustrations by Thomas Gonzalez
 The One and Only Ivan by Katherine Applegate with illustrations by Patricia Castelao
 Wonder by R.J. Palacio
 Outcasts United by Warren St. John

2014
 Preschool and up: Maya Was Grumpy written and illustrated by Courtney Pippin-Mathur (Flashlight Press)
 Kindergarten and up: Year of the Jungle: Memories from the Home Front by Suzanne Collins, illustrated by James Proimos (Scholastic Press)
 Ages 6 and up: The Matchbox Diary by Paul Fleischman, illustrated by Bagram Ibatoulline (Candlewick Press)
 Ages 8 and up: Flora & Ulysses by Kate DiCamillo, illustrated by K.G. Campbell (Candlewick Press)
 Ages 10 and up: The Boy On the Wooden Box by Leon Leyson with Marilyn J. Harran and Elisabeth B. Leyson (Atheneum Books for Young Readers/Simon and Schuster Children's Publishing)

2016
 Preschool and up: One Good Deed by Terri Fields, illustrated by Deborah Melmon (Kar-Ben Publishing)
 Kindergarten and up: An Invisible Thread Christmas Story by Laura Schroff and Alex Tresniowski, illustrated by Barry Root (Little Simon/Simon & Schuster)
 Ages 6 and up: Poet: The Remarkable Story of George Moses Horton by Don Tate (Peachtree Publishers)
 Ages 8 and up: Katie’s Cabbage by Katie Stagliano with Michelle H. Martin, illustrated by Karen Heid (Young Palmetto Books/University of South Carolina Press)
 Ages 10 and up: Firefly Hollow by Alison McGhee, illustrated by Christopher Denise (Atheneum Books for Young Readers/Simon & Schuster)
 Young Adult: Paper Hearts by Meg Wiviott (Margaret K. McElderry Books/Simon & Schuster)

Feature films

1953
Peter Pan

2001  
 Billy Elliot
 Cast Away
 Finding Forrester
 My Dog Skip
 Remember the Titans

2002
 A Beautiful Mind
 Iris
 Shrek
 The Widow of Saint-Pierre

2003
 About a Boy
 Antwone Fisher
 Evelyn
 Rabbit-Proof Fence
 Signs
 Spirited Away

2004
 In America
 Seabiscuit
 Secret Lives: Hidden Children and Their Rescuers During WWII
 The Station Agent
 Whale Rider

2005
 Finding Neverland
 Hotel Rwanda
 The Incredibles
 Miracle

2006
 Good Night, and Good Luck
 Mad Hot Ballroom
 Millions
 An Unfinished Life
 The Wild Parrots of Telegraph Hill

2007
 Akeelah and the Bee
 Charlotte's Web
 Miss Potter
 The Nativity Story
 Sophie Scholl – The Final Days
 Water
 World Trade Center 

2008
 Amazing Grace
 The Diving Bell and the Butterfly
 The Great Debaters
 Juno
 The Kite Runner
 Ratatouille

2009
 Changeling
 The Secret Life of Bees
 Slumdog Millionaire
 The Visitor
 WALL-E
 Young@Heart

2010
 The Blind Side
 Invictus
 Up

2011
 The Human Experience
 The King's Speech
 Toy Story 3
 Secretariat

2012
 Buck
 The Help
 The Muppets
 Of Gods and Men
 War Horse
 The Way

2013
 Lincoln
 Les Misérables
 Undefeated

2014
 42
 Frozen
 Gimme Shelter
 Gravity

2015
 The American Nurse
 Selma
 St. Vincent

2016
 Creed
 The Drop Box
 The Martian
 Room

2017
 Hacksaw Ridge
 Hidden Figures
 The Hollars
 Queen of Katwe

2018
 Darkest Hour
 Lady Bird
 The Star
 Wonder

2019
 Ben is Back
 Instant Family
 Paul, Apostle of Christ
 Won't You Be My Neighbor?

Television and Cable 
2016
 ABC News 20/20: Escaping ISIS (ABC News)
 America ReFramed: If You Build It (World Channel/PBS)
 Dolly Parton's Coat of Many Colors (NBC)
 The Jim Gaffigan Show: My Friend the Priest (TV Land)
 Tashi and the Monk (HBO)

References

External links
 Official website

American film awards
American television awards
American literary awards
Awards established in 1949